Archaeperidinium is a genus of dinoflagellates belonging to the family Protoperidiniaceae.

Species:

Archaeperidinium bailongense 
Archaeperidinium constrictum 
Archaeperidinium minutum 
Archaeperidinium monospinum 
Archaeperidinium saanichi

References

Dinophyceae
Dinoflagellate genera